Flash Back is an album by the Japanese electronica band Capsule. It was released on 5 December 2007. It is their first original album to be released after they announced a semi-hiatus in summer 2007, after promotions for Sugarless Girl finished. The album was also released on the same day as Nakata's recording with MEG, "Beam".

Track list
* indicates vocals from the duo's vocalist, Koshijima Toshiko.

Links　
 

Capsule (band) albums
Albums produced by Yasutaka Nakata
2007 albums